The 1948 United States House of Representatives elections were elections for the United States House of Representatives to elect members to serve in the 81st United States Congress. They were held for the most part on November 2, 1948, while Maine held theirs on September 13. These elections coincided with President Harry S. Truman's election to a full term. Truman had campaigned against a "do-nothing"' Republican Party Congress that had opposed his initiatives and was seen as counterproductive. The Democratic Party regained control of both the House and Senate in this election. For Democrats, this was their largest gain since 1932. These were the last elections until 1980 when a member of a political party other than the Democrats, Republicans, or an independent had one or more seats in the chamber. , this is the last time the Democrats gained more than 50 seats in an election.

Overall results

Special elections 

Sorted by election date, then by district.

Alabama

Arizona

Arkansas

California

Colorado

Connecticut

Delaware

Florida

Georgia

Idaho

Illinois 

Illinois redistricted its at-large seat into an additional geographical district for a total of 26, changing boundaries across the state and moving several seats from downstate into the Chicago suburbs.

Indiana

Iowa

Kansas

Kentucky

Louisiana

Maine

Maryland

Massachusetts

Michigan

Minnesota

Mississippi

Missouri

Montana

Nebraska

Nevada

New Hampshire

New Jersey

New Mexico

New York

North Carolina

North Dakota

Ohio

Oklahoma

Oregon

Pennsylvania

Rhode Island

South Carolina

South Dakota

Tennessee

Texas

Utah

Vermont

Virginia

Washington

West Virginia

Wisconsin

Wyoming

Non-voting delegates

Alaska Territory

See also 
 1948 United States elections
 1948 United States Senate elections
 1948 United States presidential election
 80th United States Congress
 81st United States Congress

Notes

References 

 
House of Eepresentatives election